Military rule may mean:
 Military justice, the legal system applying to members of the armed forces
 Martial law, where military authority takes over normal administration of law
 Militarism or militarist ideology, the ideology of government as best served when under military control
 Military occupation, when a country or area is occupied after invasion.
 List of military occupations
 Police state, where people's lives are subject to constant and often covert police surveillance
 Military dictatorship, a form of government where political power resides with the military
 Military junta ("junta," from Spanish meaning "together")
 Stratocracy, a form of government headed by military chiefs

See also
Military administration (disambiguation)

Military law
Military sociology